Emam Reza Metro Station is a station on Tabriz Metro Line 1. The station opened on 27 August 2015. It is located next on Bakeri Boulevard at Golshahr neighbourhood. It is between Sahand Metro Station and Khayyam Metro Station.

References

Tabriz Metro stations